Zeng Qingcun (born 4 May 1935) is a Chinese meteorologist and politician, and an academician of the Chinese Academy of Sciences. He was a member of the 9th and 10th National Committee of the Chinese People's Political Consultative Conference and a delegate to the 6th National People's Congress. He was an alternate member of the 13th and 14th Central Committee of the Chinese Communist Party.

Biography 
Zeng was born into a poor farmer's family in Yangjiang County, Guangdong, on 4 May 1935, during the Republic of China. He secondary studied at Liangyang High School. In 1952, he enrolled in Peking University, majoring in meteorology, where he graduated in 1956. In November 1956, he was sent abroad to study at the Institute of Geophysics of the Academy of Sciences of Soviet Union (now Russian Academy of Sciences) at the expense of the government, obtaining a vice-doctorate under the direction of Ilya Kibel in 1961.

Zeng returned to China in 1961 and that same year was assigned to the Institute of Geophysics, Chinese Academy of Sciences, where he successively worked as assistant researcher and researcher. In January 1961, he was transferred to the newly founded Institute of Atmospheric Physics, in which he moved up the ranks to become director in 1984. He was a senior visiting scholar at Princeton University between December 1980 and April 1982. In 1995, he was proposed as president of China Society for Industrial and Applied Mathematics (CSIAM), succeeding Xiao Shutie. In 1998, he was unanimously chosen as president of China Meteorological Society which he held only from 1998 to 2002, although he remained as president of China Society for Industrial and Applied Mathematics until 2000.

Honours and awards 
 1980 Member of the Chinese Academy of Sciences
 1988 State Natural Science Award (Second Class)
 1994 Foreign Academician of the Russian Academy of Sciences
 1995 Member of the Third World Academy of Sciences
 1995 Science and Technology Progress Award of the Ho Leung Ho Lee Foundation 
 2005 State Natural Science Award (Second Class)
 2014 Honorary Member of the American Meteorological Society
 2020 Highest Science and Technology Award

References 

1935 births
Living people
People from Yangjiang
Scientists from Guangdong
Peking University alumni
Members of the 9th Chinese People's Political Consultative Conference
Members of the 10th Chinese People's Political Consultative Conference
Alternate members of the 13th Central Committee of the Chinese Communist Party
Alternate members of the 14th Central Committee of the Chinese Communist Party
Delegates to the 6th National People's Congress
Members of the Chinese Academy of Sciences